The huge moth family Noctuidae contains the following genera:

A B C D E F G H I J K L M N O P Q R S T U V W X Y Z

Lacanobia
Lacera
Lacibisa
Lacides
Lacinipolia
Lagoptera
Lambana
Lampadephora
Lampra
Lamprolopha
Lamprosia
Lamprosticta
Lamprotes
Lamura
Lankialaia
Laphygma
Laquea
Larassa
Larixsotis
Lascoria
Lasianobia
Lasiestra
Lasionhada
Lasionycta
Lasiopoderes
Lasiplexia
Lasiridia
Laspeyria
Latanoctua
Latebraria
Lathosea
Latiphaea
Latirostrum
Laugasa
Lecasia
Lecerfia
Ledaea
Ledereragrotis
Leida
Leiometopon
Leiorhynx
Leioselia
Leiostola
Leistera
Lemmeria
Leonides
Leoniloma
Lephana
Lepidodelta
Lepidodes
Lepidopalpia
Lepidopyrga
Lepidotrama
Lepipolys
Lepitoreuma
Leptamma
Lepteria
Leptoctenista
Leptologia
Leptotroga
Lesmone
Letaba
Letis
Leucagrotis
Leucania
Leucanimorpha
Leucanitis
Leucapamea
Leucatomis
Leucochlaena
Leucocnemis
Leucocosmia
Leucogonia
Leucogramma
Leucomelas
Leuconycta
Leucosemia
Leucosigma
Leucotela
Leucotelia
Leucotrachea
Leucovis
Leumicamia
Libisosa
Libyana
Libyphaenis
Libystica
Licha
Ligidia
Lignicida
Lignispalta
Lineopalpa
Lineostriastiria
Lipatephia
Listonia
Lithacodia
Lithilaria
Litholomia
Lithomoia
Lithophane
Lithophasia
Lithopolia
Lithosiopsis
Litocala
Litognatha
Litomitus
Litoprosopus
Litoscelis
Litosea
Liviana
Lobophyllodes
Loboplusia
Lobotorna
Lochia
Lois
Lomanaltes
Lomilysis
Longalatedes
Longicella
Longivesica
Lopharthrum
Lophiophora
Lophocalama
Lophoceramica
Lophocerynea
Lophocoleus
Lophocraspedon
Lophocryptis
Lophocyttarra
Lophodaxa
Lophodelta
Lophoditta
Lophograpta
Lophomilia
Lophomyra
Lophonotidia
Lophonycta
Lophopanilla
Lophophora
Lophoplusia
Lophoptera
Lophorache
Lophoruza
Lophotarsia
Lophotavia
Lophoterges
Lophotidia
Lophotoma
Lophotyna
Lophozancla
Lophuda
Lorezia
Loscopia
Loxagrotis
Loxioda
Loxopamea
Luberta
Lucasidia
Luceria
Luceriola
Lugana
Lukaschia
Luperina
Luteohadena
Lutogonia
Lycanades
Lycaugesia
Lycimna
Lycophorus
Lycophotia
Lygephila
Lygniodes
Lygranthoecia
Lyncestis
Lysimelia
Lyssia
Lytaea
Lythrodes

References 

 Natural History Museum Lepidoptera genus database

 
Noctuid genera L